Seston can simply be defined as the particles suspended in bodies of water such as lakes, oceans, ponds and rivers. The term "seston" applies to plankton, organic detritus, and minerals. Detritus is dead organic material and a mineral is a solid chemical compound. Small particles of seston may be formed by the breaking down of larger particles. This can happen by the crashing of waves, mixing of water currents, or by slow disintegration. Most seston in the water is made up of a combination of both organic and inorganic compounds. The inorganic compounds are from mineral origin and are essentially particles of mud suspended in the water column. The organic compounds are from biological origin and can be either living or dead.

Seston is used by many species in their day-to-day activities. Some examples are barnacles, mussels, scallops, corals, sea anemones, sea squirts, and sea cucumbers. Suspension feeders and filter feeders like whales also rely on seston as a food source. Nutrient-rich seston particles can support the local ecosystem by providing nutrition to organisms. The higher the amount of organic matter in the seston, the more nutritious it is for the suspension feeders who count on seston as a food source. Many of these animals have adapted to be able to eat both organic and inorganic seston. Animals that eat seston also have to adapt because the seston is not always present or may have periods of time when it is less nutritious. They adapt by eating more when it is there or by storing it to eat later when it would otherwise be unavailable. Studies of rivers have shown that downstream seston is more nutritious that it is upstream.

While seston is necessary for many animals and in many ecosystems, it can also be harmful in large quantities. Sometimes human activities like fishing and farming that generate nutrient-rich surface runoff can make the presence of organic seston increase dramatically. This sudden increase can destabilize the ecosystem if there are not enough organisms that eat that seston to make up for the increase. As the amount of seston grows, the other organisms in the ecosystem may not be able to live there anymore, the end stage of cultural eutrophication. Florida often sees one example of this issue with the algae bloom on Lake Okeechobee. Runoff from nearby farming increases the nutrients in the lake and causes the amount of algae to grow. Especially in the more shallow parts of Lake Okeechobee, the algae grows very well because it requires sunlight to carry out the process of photosynthesis to make food for itself. Because parts of Lake Okeechobee are so shallow, there is a high degree of light penetration through the water, which allows more of the algae to receive the sunlight it needs. Because the algae needs a warm and sunny environment, this is especially a problem in warmer climates like Florida’s. Some of the algae bloom is blue-green algae, which is also known as cyanobacteria. It grows very quickly when it has nutrition from nitrogen and phosphorus.  The algae bloom decreases water quality and can make people and animals sick. Some symptoms in people include nausea and vomiting, but the worst side effect could be liver failure. Since Lake Okeechobee waters are released to the ocean through canals to the east and west, coastal areas in Florida are affected too. The algae bloom has caused businesses near the ocean to close and hurt tourism revenues in recent years. Florida has even declared a state of emergency in the past because of the algae bloom.

See also 
Aquatic animal
Aquatic ecosystem
Marine snow

References

Biological oceanography
Limnology
Aquatic ecology